Allen J. Flannigan was a member of the Wisconsin State Assembly.

Biography
Flanngian was born on June 9, 1909, in Princeton, Indiana. He attended the University of Illinois at Urbana–Champaign and the University of Wisconsin–Madison. During World War II, he served in the United States Army Signal Corps. He worked as a teletype operator, telegram office manager, and then a tool grinder. Flannigan was involved with the United Steelworkers labor union. On February 17, 1965, Flannigan died in Milwaukee, Wisconsin, as a result of a fall on some ice at home.

Political career
Flannigan was first elected to the Assembly in 1956 and was re-elected in 1958, 1960, 1962, and 1964. He was a Democrat.

References

People from Princeton, Indiana
Military personnel from Wisconsin
United States Army soldiers
United States Army personnel of World War II
University of Illinois Urbana-Champaign alumni
University of Wisconsin–Madison alumni
1909 births
1965 deaths
20th-century American politicians
Democratic Party members of the Wisconsin State Assembly